"Tonari no Heya" (The Room Next Door) is Jun Shibata's 5th single. It was released on January 29, 2003 and peaked at #17.

Track listing
Tonari no heya (隣の部屋; The Room Next Door)
Wasuremono (忘れもの; Lost Objects)

Charts

External links
http://www.shibatajun.com— Shibata Jun Official Website 

2003 singles
Jun Shibata songs
2003 songs